is a song by Japanese idol group Sexy Zone. It was released on October 3, 2012, as its third single under Pony Canyon. The song was written by Yoshiko Miura, Janne Hyoty, and Martin Grano.

"Sexy Summer ni Yuki ga Furu" was released in four editions: Regular Edition, Limited Editions A and B, and Venue Limited Summary 2012. It ranked number one on both the Oricon Singles Chart and Billboard Japan Hot 100. The single was certified gold by the Recording Industry Association of Japan (RIAJ), denoting shipments of 100,000 units.

Background
"Ame Datte" was recorded by the Sexy Boyz unit, which consists of members Marius Yo and So Matsushima, in addition to Yūta Jinguuji, Reia Nakamura, Kaoru Kuramoto, Amu Hanyūda, Daigo Nishihata, and Ren Nagase.

Release and promotion
Sexy Zone imitated promotions for "Sexy Summer ni Yuki ga Furu" by performing it on NHK's music program Music Japan on September 30, 2012. The track was used as the theme song for the Fuji TV reality program Real Scope Z. "Kimi no Tame ni Boku ga Iru" was used for volleyball at the 2012 Summer Olympics.

"Sexy Summer ni Yuki ga Furu" was released on October 3 in four editions: Regular Edition; Limited Edition A with bonus DVD content that includes the music video for the title track; Limited Edition B with bonus DVD content that includes behind-the-scenes footage of the music video; and Venue Limited Summary 2012.

Commercial performance
On the issue dated October 15, 2012, "Sexy Summer ni Yuki ga Furu" debuted at number one on Japan's national weekly Oricon Singles Chart, selling 95,154 copies in its first week. It marked Sexy Zone's third consecutive number-one single since its debut, a feat previously achieved by Kis-My-Ft2's "She! Her! Her!". Among teenage male acts, it was last accomplished by Hey! Say! JUMP's "Your Seed"/"Bōken Rider" four years and two months earlier. On the Billboard Japan Hot 100, the song debuted at number 45 and topped the chart the following week.

"Sexy Summer ni Yuki ga Furu" was certified gold at the end of the month by the Recording Industry Association of Japan for shipments exceeding 100,000 units. According to Oricon's year-end report, the single sold 113,280 copies domestically and ranked number 68 on its list of best-selling singles.

Track listing

Charts

Weekly

Year-end

References

2012 singles
2012 songs
Billboard Japan Hot 100 number-one singles
Japanese-language songs
Oricon Weekly number-one singles
Pony Canyon singles
Sexy Zone songs